Dirty Dancing is a 1987 American romantic drama dance film written by Eleanor Bergstein, produced by Linda Gottlieb, and directed by Emile Ardolino. Starring Patrick Swayze and Jennifer Grey, it tells the story of Frances "Baby" Houseman, a young woman who falls in love with dance instructor Johnny Castle (Swayze) at a vacation resort.

The film was based on screenwriter Bergstein's own childhood. She originally wrote a screenplay for the Michael Douglas film It's My Turn, but ultimately ended up conceiving a story for a film which became Dirty Dancing. She finished the script in 1985, but management changes at Metro-Goldwyn-Mayer put the film in development hell. The production company was changed to Vestron Pictures with Emile Ardolino as director and Linda Gottlieb as producer. Filming took place in Lake Lure, North Carolina, and Mountain Lake, Virginia, with the film's score composed by John Morris and dance choreography by Kenny Ortega.

Dirty Dancing premiered at the 1987 Cannes Film Festival on May 12, 1987, and was released on August 21, 1987, in the United States, earning over $214 million worldwide, and was the first film to sell more than a million copies for home video. It earned positive reviews from critics, who particularly praised the performances of Grey and Swayze, and its soundtrack, created by Jimmy Ienner, generated two multi-platinum albums and multiple singles. "(I've Had) The Time of My Life", performed by Bill Medley and Jennifer Warnes, won the Academy Award for Best Original Song, the Golden Globe Award for Best Original Song, and the Grammy Award for Best Pop Performance by a Duo or Group with Vocals.

The film's popularity led to a 2004 prequel, Dirty Dancing: Havana Nights, and a stage version which has had sellout performances in Australia, Europe, and North America. A made-for-TV remake was also released in 2017. A sequel is scheduled to be released in 2024, with Grey reprising her role.

Plot

In the summer of 1963, 17-year-old Frances "Baby" Houseman is vacationing with her parents, Dr. Jake and Marjorie Houseman, and her older sister Lisa at Kellerman's, an upscale Catskills resort in the Borscht Belt owned by Jake's sarcastic best friend Max. Exploring one night, Baby secretly observes Max instructing the waiters, all Ivy League students, to romance the guests' daughters, no matter how unattractive. Max also demeans the working class entertainment staff, including Johnny Castle, one of the dance instructors. Baby is attracted to Johnny and dances briefly with him after his kindhearted cousin, Billy, introduces them at a secret "dirty dancing" party for resort staff. Max's grandson Neil flirts with Baby in the meantime.

Baby learns Johnny's dance partner Penny is pregnant by Robbie, a waiter and womanizer who attends Yale School of Medicine and now has his eye on Lisa. When Robbie refuses to help Penny, Baby, without explaining why, borrows money from her father to pay for Penny's abortion. At first, Penny declines as it would cause her and Johnny to miss a performance at a nearby resort, costing them the season's salary, but Baby volunteers to stand in for Penny. During her dance sessions with Johnny, they develop a mutual attraction, and despite their failure to execute a climactic lift, Johnny and Baby's performance is successful.

Back at Kellerman's, Penny is gravely injured by the botched abortion, and Baby enlists her father's help to stabilize Penny. Angered by Baby's deception, and assuming Johnny got Penny pregnant, Dr. Houseman orders Baby to stay away from them. Baby sneaks off to apologize to Johnny for her dad's treatment, but Johnny feels he deserves it due to his lower status; Baby reassures him of his worth, declaring her love. They begin secretly seeing each other, and her father refuses to talk to her.

Johnny rejects an indecent proposal by Vivian Pressman, an adulterous wife, who instead sleeps with Robbie, inadvertently foiling Lisa's plan to lose her virginity to him. When Vivian spots Baby leaving Johnny's cabin, she feels spurned and attempts revenge on Johnny by claiming he stole her husband's wallet. Max is ready to fire Johnny, but Baby backs up his alibi, revealing she was with Johnny the night of the theft. The real thieves, Sydney and Sylvia Schumacher, are caught, but Johnny is still fired for mixing with Baby. Before leaving, Johnny tries to talk to Dr. Houseman but is accused of only trying to get at Baby. Baby later apologizes to her father for lying, but not for her romance with Johnny, and then accuses him of classism.

At the end-of-season talent show, Dr. Houseman gives Robbie a recommendation letter for medical school, but when Robbie admits that he got Penny pregnant, and then insults her and Baby, Dr. Houseman angrily grabs the letter back. Johnny arrives and disrupts the final song by bringing Baby up on stage and declaring that she has made him a better person, and then they perform the dance they practiced all summer, ending with a successful climactic lift. Dr. Houseman admits he was wrong about Johnny and reconciles with Baby, and all the staff and guests join Baby and Johnny dancing to "(I've Had) The Time of My Life".

Cast

Bruce Morrow appears in a cameo as a magician; Morrow himself could be heard as a DJ's voice in different parts of the film. Emile Ardolino and Matthew Broderick (who was dating Grey at the time and co-starred with her in Ferris Bueller's Day Off) have cameos.

Soundtrack

 "Be My Baby" – The Ronettes
 "Big Girls Don't Cry" – Frankie Valli and The Four Seasons
 "Where Are You Tonight?" – Tom Johnston
 "Do You Love Me" – The Contours
 "Love Man" – Otis Redding
 "Stay" – Maurice Williams and the Zodiacs
 "Hungry Eyes" – Eric Carmen
 "Overload" – Zappacosta
 "Hey! Baby" – Bruce Channel
 "De Todo Un Poco" – Michael Lloyd & Le Disc
 "Some Kind of Wonderful" – The Drifters
 "These Arms of Mine" – Otis Redding
 "Cry to Me" – Solomon Burke
 "Will You Love Me Tomorrow" – The Shirelles
 "Love Is Strange" – Mickey & Sylvia
 "You Don't Own Me" – The Blow Monkeys
 "Yes" – Merry Clayton
 "In the Still of the Night" – The Five Satins
 "She's Like the Wind" – Patrick Swayze
 "(I've Had) The Time of My Life" – Bill Medley and Jennifer Warnes

The Dirty Dancing album held the number one spot on the Billboard album chart for over four months. As of July 2022, the Dirty Dancing album has sold over 14 million copies. Actress Jane Brucker wrote the song "Hula Hana", which she performed in her role of Lisa in the show rehearsal scene.

Production

Pre-production
Dirty Dancing is based in large part on screenwriter Eleanor Bergstein's own childhood: she is the younger daughter of a Jewish doctor from New York and had spent summers with her family in the Catskills where she participated in "Dirty Dancing" competitions; she was also nicknamed "Baby" herself as a girl. In 1980, Bergstein wrote a screenplay for the Michael Douglas film, It's My Turn; however, the producers cut an erotic dancing scene from the script, prompting her to conceive a new story that took inspiration from her youth dance competitions. In 1984, she pitched the idea to Metro-Goldwyn-Mayer (MGM) executive Eileen Miselle, who liked it and teamed Bergstein with producer Linda Gottlieb. They set the film in 1963, with the character of Baby based on Bergstein's own life and the character of Johnny based on the stories of Michael Terrace, a dance instructor whom Bergstein met in the Catskills in 1985 while she was researching the story. She finished the script in November 1985, but management changes at MGM put the script into turnaround, or limbo.

Bergstein gave the script to other studios but was repeatedly rejected until she brought it to Vestron Pictures. While honing their pitch to Vestron, Gottlieb had agreed to cut the proposed budget in half. Bergstein and Gottlieb then chose Emile Ardolino as the film's director; Ardolino had never directed a feature film, but was extremely passionate about the project after reading the script while he was on jury duty. The team of Gottlieb, Bergstein, and Ardolino then presented their vision for the film to Vestron's president, Jon Peisinger, and the company's vice president for production, Mitchell Cannold. By the end of the meeting, Peisinger had greenlit the project to become Vestron's first feature film production. The approved film was budgeted at the relatively low amount of $5 million, at a time when the average cost for a film was $12 million.

For choreographer, Bergstein chose Kenny Ortega, who had been trained by Gene Kelly. For a location, they did not find anything suitable in the Catskills (as many of the Borscht Belt resorts had been shut down at that point), so they decided on a combination of two locations: Lake Lure, North Carolina, and the Mountain Lake Hotel near Pembroke, Virginia, and with careful editing made it look like all shooting was done in the same area.

Casting
Director Ardolino was adamant that they choose dancers, such as Swayze, who could also act, as he did not want to use the "stand-in" method that had been used with Flashdance (1983).

For the female lead of Frances "Baby" Houseman, Winona Ryder, Sarah Jessica Parker and Sharon Stone were considered. Bergstein chose the 26-year-old Jennifer Grey, daughter of the Oscar-winning actor and dancer Joel Grey (e.g., of the film Cabaret (1972)). Grey was paid $50,000 for her role. The producers then sought a male lead, initially considering 20-year-old Billy Zane, though initial screen tests when he was partnered with Grey did not meet expectations. Val Kilmer and Benicio del Toro were also considered for Johnny. The next choice was 34-year-old Patrick Swayze, who appeared in Grandview, U.S.A. (1984) and had co-starred with Grey on Red Dawn (1984). He was a seasoned dancer, with experience from the Joffrey Ballet. The producers were thrilled with him, but his resume read "No dancing" after a knee injury. However, Swayze read the script, liked the multi-level character of Johnny, and took the part anyway. After this, Johnny's heritage was changed from being Italian to Irish. Grey was initially not happy about the choice, as she and Swayze had difficulty getting along on Red Dawn, but when they did their dancing screen test, the chemistry between them was obvious. Bergstein described it as "breathtaking". Other casting choices were Broadway actor Jerry Orbach as Dr. Jake Houseman, Baby's father; and Jane Brucker as Lisa Houseman, her older sister.

Bergstein, as the film's writer, also attempted to cast her friend, sex therapist Dr. Ruth Westheimer, to play Mrs. Schumacher (and Joel Grey as Dr. Ruth's husband). However, Westheimer backed out when she learned the role involved her playing a thief. The role went instead to 89-year-old Paula Trueman.

Another role went to Bergstein's friend, New York radio personality "Cousin Brucie" Morrow. She initially wanted him to portray the social director, but then later asked him to play the part of the magician. Morrow himself could be heard at different parts of the movie as a New York area DJ (at the time of the film's setting he was working at WABC, a top 40 station), and served as period music consultant. The role of the social director went to the then-unknown Wayne Knight (later of Seinfeld and 3rd Rock from the Sun fame).

The part of Baby's mother was originally given to Lynne Lipton, who is briefly visible in the beginning, when the Houseman family first pulls into Kellerman's (she is in the front seat for a few seconds; her blonde hair is the only indication), but she became ill during the first week of shooting and was replaced by actress Kelly Bishop, who had already been cast to play resort guest Vivian Pressman. Bishop moved into the role of Mrs. Houseman, and the film's assistant choreographer Miranda Garrison took on the role of Vivian. (When Baby is dancing in the final scene, the line that her mother says to Jerry Orbach, "She gets that from me ..." is a wink to the fact that Kelly Bishop was in the original cast of A Chorus Line, using the name at that time of Carole Bishop, and had been a professional dancer.)

Filming

Principal photography for Dirty Dancing took place in Lake Lure, North Carolina, and Mountain Lake, Virginia. Scenes in Lake Lure were filmed at a former Boy Scout Camp called Camp Occoneechee, which is now a private, residential community known as Firefly Cove. These scenes included the interior dancing scenes, Baby carrying the watermelon and practicing on the signature stairs, Johnny's cabin, the staff cabins, the golf scene where Baby asks her father for $250 and the famous "log" scenes. The climactic lift scene was filmed in the ballroom of the Lake Lure Inn. Scenes filmed at Mountain Lake included dining scenes, Kellerman's Hotel, the beach games, the Houseman family's cabins, the water lift scene and Penny crying in the kitchen.

Filming started for Dirty Dancing on September 5, 1986, and lasted just 43 days. According to choreographer Kenny Ortega, 10 people passed out within 25 minutes of shooting one day. Paula Trueman collapsed and was taken to the local emergency room to be treated for dehydration. Patrick Swayze also required a hospital visit; insisting on doing his own stunts, he repeatedly fell off the log during the "balancing" scene and injured his knee so badly he had to have fluid drained from the swelling.

Delays in the shooting schedule pushed filming into the autumn, which required the set decorators to spray-paint the autumn leaves green. The weather became cold, causing the lake's temperatures to drop to near  for the famous swimming scene, which was filmed in October. Despite her character's enjoyment, Grey later described the water as "horrifically" cold, and she might not have gone into the lake, except that she was "young and hungry".

Relations between the two main stars varied throughout production. They had already had trouble getting along in their previous project, Red Dawn (1984), and worked things out enough to have an extremely positive screen test, but that initial cooperation soon faded, and they were soon "facing off" before every scene. To address this, producer Bergstein and director Ardolino forced the stars to re-watch their initial screen-tests—the ones with the "breathtaking" chemistry. This had the desired effect, and Swayze and Grey were able to return to the film with renewed energy and enthusiasm.

Some of the scenes in the film are improvised. For example, the scene where Grey was to stand in front of Swayze with her back to him and put her arm up behind his head while he trailed his fingers down her arm. Grey was exhausted at the time and found the move ticklish, and could not stop giggling each time Swayze tried it, and he became annoyed. The footage was found in the editing room and the producers decided the scene worked as it was and put it into the film, complete with Grey's giggling and Swayze's annoyed expression. It became one of the most famous scenes in the movie, turning out, as choreographer Kenny Ortega put it, "as one of the most delicate and honest moments in the film."

Post-production
The shooting wrapped on October 27, 1986, both on-time and on-budget. No one on the team, however, liked the rough cut that was put together, and Vestron executives were convinced the film was going to be a flop. Thirty-nine percent of people who viewed the film did not realize abortion was the subplot. In May 1987, the film was screened for producer Aaron Russo. According to Vestron executive Mitchell Cannold, Russo's reaction at the end was to say simply, "Burn the negative, and collect the insurance."

Further disputes arose over whether a corporate sponsor could be found to promote the film. Marketers of the Clearasil acne product liked the film, seeing it as a vehicle to reach a teen target audience. However, when they learned the film contained an abortion scene, they asked for that part of the plot to be cut. As Bergstein refused, the Clearasil promotion was dropped. Consequently, Vestron promoted the film themselves and initially aimed for a July premiere before setting the premiere on August 16, 1987. The Vestron executives had planned to release the film in theaters for a weekend, and then home video, since Vestron had been in the video distribution business before film production.

Reception

Critical response
Review aggregator Rotten Tomatoes gives the film a rating of 70% based on reviews from 74 critics and a rating average of 6.30/10. The site's critical consensus reads, "Like its winsome characters, Dirty Dancing uses impressive choreography and the power of song to surmount a series of formidable obstacles." Metacritic, another review aggregator, assigned the film a weighted average score of 65 out of 100, based on 20 critics, indicating "generally favorable reviews". Audiences polled by CinemaScore gave the film an average grade of "A−" on an A+ to F scale.

The New York Times described the film as "a metaphor for America in the summer of 1963— orderly, prosperous, bursting with good intentions, a sort of Yiddish-inflected Camelot." Other reviews were more mixed: Gene Siskel gave the film a "marginal Thumbs Up" as he liked Jennifer Grey's acting and development of her character, while Roger Ebert gave it "Thumbs Down" due to its "idiot plot", calling it a "tired and relentlessly predictable story of love between kids from different backgrounds." Time magazine was lukewarm, saying, "If the ending of Eleanor Bergstein's script is too neat and inspirational, the rough energy of the film's song and dance does carry one along, past the whispered doubts of better judgment." In a retrospective review, Jezebels Irin Carmon called the film "the greatest movie of all time" as "a great, brave movie for women" with "some subtle, retrospectively sharp-eyed critiques of class and gender."

Abortion rights advocates have called the film the "gold standard" for cinematic portrayals of abortion, which author Yannis Tzioumakis described as offering a "compassionate depiction of abortion in which the woman seeking an abortion was not demonized with the primary concerns being her health and preserving her capacity to bear children at a future time rather than the ethical dilemma that might or might not inform her decision, a portrayal that is not necessarily available in current films."

The film drew adult audiences instead of the expected teens, with viewers rating the film highly. Many filmgoers, after seeing the film once, went back into the theater to watch it a second time. Word-of-mouth promotion took the film to the number one position in the United States, and in 10 days it had broken the $10 million mark. By November, it was also achieving international fame. Within seven months of release, it had brought in $63 million in the US and boosted attendance in dance classes across America. It was one of the highest-grossing films of 1987, earning $170 million worldwide.

The film's popularity continued to grow after its initial release. It was the number one video rental of 1988 and became the first film to sell a million copies on video. When the film was re-released in 1997, ten years after its original release, Swayze received his own star on the Hollywood Walk of Fame, and videos were still selling at the rate of over 40,000 per month. , it was selling a million DVDs per year, with over ten million copies sold .

A May 2007 survey by Britain's Sky Movies listed Dirty Dancing as number one on "Women's most-watched films", above the Star Wars trilogy, Grease, The Sound of Music, and Pretty Woman. The film's popularity has also caused it to be called "the Star Wars for girls."

The film's music has also had considerable impact. The closing song, "(I've Had) The Time of My Life", has been listed as the "third most popular song played at funerals" in the UK.

In October 2021, amid a dispute over abortion in Texas, magazine The Hollywood Reporter recommended the film as one to revisit on abortion in the cinema industry. Angie Han, writing for the magazine, highlighted Eleanor Bergstein's writing of the film.

Awards and honors

The film is recognized by American Film Institute in these lists:
 2002: AFI's 100 Years...100 Passions – #93
 2004: AFI's 100 Years...100 Songs:
 "(I've Had) The Time of My Life" – #86
 "Do You Love Me" – Nominated
 2005: AFI's 100 Years...100 Movie Quotes:
 Johnny Castle: "Nobody puts Baby in a corner." – #98
 2006: AFI's 100 Years...100 Cheers – Nominated

Music

Rehearsals for the dancing, and some filming, used music from Bergstein's personal collection of gramophone records. When it came time to select actual music for the film, Vestron chose Jimmy Ienner as music supervisor. Ienner, who had previously produced albums and songs for John Lennon and Three Dog Night, opted to stick with much of the music that had already been used during filming and obtained licenses for the songs from Bergstein's collection. He also enlisted Swayze to sing the new song "She's Like the Wind". Swayze had written the song a few years earlier with Stacy Widelitz, originally intending for it to be used in the film Grandview, U.S.A. (1984).

John Morris composed the film's score. The lyrics for the Kellermans' song that closes the talent show were written specifically for the film and were sung to the tune of "Annie Lisle", a commonly used theme for school alma maters. Kenny Ortega and his assistant Miranda Garrison chose the song for the finale by going through an entire box of tapes, listening to each one. According to Ortega, literally the last tape they listened to had "The Time of My Life", which they saw as the obvious choice. Ienner then insisted that Bill Medley and Jennifer Warnes record it. The song won the 1988 Grammy Award for Best Pop Performance by a Duo or Group, an Academy Award for Best Original Song, and the Golden Globe Award for Best Original Song.

The film's soundtrack started an oldies music revival, and demand for the album caught RCA Records by surprise. The Dirty Dancing album spent 18 weeks at number one on the Billboard 200 album sales charts and went platinum 14 times, selling more than 32 million copies worldwide. It spawned a follow-up multi-platinum album in February 1988, entitled More Dirty Dancing.

Songs from the album that appeared on the charts included:
 "(I've Had) The Time of My Life," performed by Bill Medley and Jennifer Warnes, composed by Franke Previte, John deNicola, and Donald Markowitz – this song rose to No. 1 on the pop charts.
 "She's Like the Wind," performed by lead actor Patrick Swayze, composed by Swayze and Stacy Widelitz; this song peaked at No. 3 in 1988.
 "Hungry Eyes," performed by Eric Carmen, composed by Franke Previte and John deNicola; this song peaked at No. 4 in 1988.
 "Yes," performed by Merry Clayton, composed by Neal Cavanaugh, Terry Fryer, and Tom Graf; this song peaked No. 45 in 1988.

Additionally, the resurgence in popularity of the oldies contained in the movie led to a re-release of The Contours' single "Do You Love Me." "Do You Love Me" was featured in the movie but was omitted from the original soundtrack; it was included on More Dirty Dancing. Upon being re-released, "Do You Love Me" became a surprise hit all over again, this time peaking at No. 11 (it originally hit No. 3 back in 1962).

Legacy

Various images and lines from the film have worked their way into popular culture. Johnny Castle's line, "Nobody puts Baby in a corner", has been used in song lyrics, as the title of the "Nobody Puts Baby in a Corner" episode of the TV series Veronica Mars, and as the title of a Fall Out Boy song. "Nobody puts Baby in a corner" was also quoted in Supernatural: when Dean says the line concerning his beloved Impala and his brother Sam retorts that the line is from a Swayze movie; Dean responds: "Swayze always gets a pass". The line was parodied in the webcomic Looking for Group where Richard, one of the primary characters, uttered a variation involving his own name, and in Family Guy, where the scene is parodied by Baby's parents questioning Johnny due to her youth. In Sweden, feminist art group Sisters of Jam put the text "Nobody puts Baby in a corner" (in English) in white neon light at Umeå Bus Square (2008) and at Karlstad University (2012).

Family Guy also parodies the scene where Baby first sees Johnny dancing with the staff. In the TV series How I Met Your Mother, Barney Stinson attempts to pass off the Dirty Dancing story as the story of his own loss of virginity because he is ashamed of his actual story; the original "Love is Strange" scene is shown with Barney replacing Johnny.

The famous lift scene is also widely referenced in popular culture. In the 2011 film Crazy, Stupid, Love Ryan Gosling's character is able to perform the "move from Dirty Dancing” and does it with Emma Stone's character.  In 2015, UnitedHealthcare released a commercial with a couple dancing and attempting to perform the "lift" scene. In the soap opera Coronation Street the famous lift dance sequence was rehearsed for the 2018 wedding of Steve McDonald and Tracy Barlow and was also performed to "The Time of My Life" as in the film.

The French film Heartbreaker (2010) pays homage to the film, as a plot detail, with some clips from the film shown and a "recreation" by the two main characters of the "lift" scene.

In the first episode of the TV series New Girl, the female lead Jess watches the film repeatedly after her break up. Jess continues to repeatedly watch the film after various break-ups throughout the series.

The resort where Dirty Dancing was filmed has themed weekend activities, such as dance lessons, guided tours, film screenings, parties, and lawn games.

The film is screened annually for incoming first-years at Mount Holyoke College, specifically for the line "Baby's starting Mount Holyoke in the fall."

Alternate versions

Stage version

The film was adapted for the stage in 2004 as a musical, Dirty Dancing: The Classic Story on Stage. Produced by Jacobsen Entertainment in Australia for $6.5 million, it was written by Eleanor Bergstein and had the same songs as the film, plus a few extra scenes. Musical direction was by Chong Lim (one of the composers for the 2000 Summer Olympics in Sydney), and the initial production starred Kym Valentine as Baby and Sydney Dance Company's Josef Brown as Johnny. Although reviews were mixed, the production was a commercial success, selling over 200,000 tickets during its six-month run. It has also had sellout runs in Germany and in London's West End, where it opened at the Aldwych Theatre on October 23, 2006, with the highest pre-sell in London history, earning £6 million (US$12 million). , over 1 million people have seen the musical in London, selling out 6 months in advance. The original West End production closed in July 2011 after a five-year run, prior to a two-year national tour. The show returned to the West End at the Piccadilly Theatre and ran from July 13, 2013, to February 22, 2014, before resuming its tour of the United Kingdom and the Republic of Ireland.

A New York production was in the planning stage in 2006, with the show first starting in other North American cities. It broke box office records in May 2007 for its first such venue, selling $2 million on the first day of ticket sales in Toronto, Ontario, Canada. The production opened on November 15, 2007, at the Royal Alexandra Theatre, with an all-Canadian cast, except for Monica West (Baby Housman), Britta Lazenga (Penny), and Al Sapienza (Jack Housman). After Toronto, the musical opened in Chicago in previews on September 28, 2008, and officially on October 19, 2008, running through January 17, 2009, followed by Boston (February 7 – March 15, 2009) and Los Angeles.

An official American tour began in September 2014 at the National Theatre in Washington, DC with dates scheduled in 31 cities. Previews started August 26 and the official opening night was on September 2. The original tour's cast included Jillian Mueller as Frances "Baby" Houseman, Samuel Pergande as Johnny Castle, Jenny Winton as Penny Johnson, Mark Elliot Wilson as Dr. Jack Houseman, Emily Rice as Lisa Houseman, Gary Lynch as Max Kellerman, Jesse Liebman as Neil Kellerman, Caralyn Kozlowski as Marjorie Houseman, Sam Edgerly as Robbie Gould, Jerome Harmann-Hardeman as Tito Suarez, Doug Carpenter as Billy Kostecki, Amanda Brantley as Vivian Pressman, Jon Drake as Moe Pressman, and Herman Petras as Mr. Schumacher.

Tours and TV show
Dirty Dancing has appeared in other forms than the stage version. In 1988, a music tour named Dirty Dancing: Live in Concert, featuring Bill Medley and Eric Carmen, played 90 cities in three months. Also in 1988, the CBS network launched a Dirty Dancing television series, however with none of the original cast or crew. The series was canceled after only a few episodes.

Sequel
In 2020, a sequel to the film was announced. Jennifer Grey will reprise the role as Baby Houseman. 
As part of their presentation during CinemaCon 2022, producer and, through their ownership of the Vestron library, current owner of the film Lionsgate announced the film had the tentative title of DD and reaffirmed that Grey would still reprise her role as Baby. On May 9, 2022, it was announced that the film was eyeing a 2024 release date, with Jonathan Levine announced to direct.

Prequel
In 2004, a prequel of the film was released, entitled Dirty Dancing: Havana Nights. It tells the story of a sheltered American teenager learning about life through dance, when her family relocates to Havana, Cuba just before the 1959 Cuban Revolution. Swayze was paid $5 million to appear in a cameo role as a dance teacher.

20th anniversary releases
For the 20th anniversary in 2007, the film was re-released in theaters with additional footage, while the original film version was re-released on DVD with deleted scenes, and included writer commentary. At the same time, Codemasters released Dirty Dancing: The Video Game. In the United Kingdom, the anniversary was marked by a reality TV show based on the film; titled Dirty Dancing: The Time of Your Life, the TV show was filmed at the Mountain Lake resort.

In the UK, to mark the 20th anniversary of the film, Channel 5 broadcast a special documentary called Seriously Dirty Dancing. It was presented by Dawn Porter, an investigative journalist and a self-confessed Dirty Dancing addict. The documentary was very successful, being Channel Five's highest rated documentary of 2007. Porter visited the set of the film, met other Dirty Dancing fanatics, and learned the last dance, which she performed at the end of the documentary in front of family and friends.

Remake

In August 2011, Lionsgate, which owns the film rights, announced their plan to remake the film. It was confirmed that the studio had hired the film's choreographer, Kenny Ortega, to direct. "We believe that the timing couldn't be better to modernize this story on the big screen, and we are proud to have Kenny Ortega at the helm", Joe Drake, president of Lionsgate's Motion Picture Group, explained about the project. A miniseries version of Dirty Dancing had been scheduled to be shot in Western North Carolina. , the miniseries has been put on hold.

In December 2015, ABC ordered a three-hour musical remake of Dirty Dancing, starring Abigail Breslin, Colt Prattes, Debra Messing, Sarah Hyland, Nicole Scherzinger, Billy Dee Williams & Shane Harper. It aired on May 24, 2017. It received negative reviews from a majority of critics.

References

External links

 
 
 
 
 
 

Dirty Dancing films
1987 films
1987 directorial debut films
1987 independent films
1980s coming-of-age drama films
1980s dance films
1980s feminist films
1980s musical drama films
1987 romantic drama films
1980s English-language films
1980s romantic musical films
1980s teen drama films
1980s teen romance films
American coming-of-age drama films
American dance films
American independent films
American musical drama films
American romantic drama films
American romantic musical films
American teen drama films
American teen romance films
Artisan Entertainment films
Borscht Belt
Coming-of-age romance films
Films about abortion
Films about father–daughter relationships
Films about families
Films about interclass romance
Films about social class
Films about vacationing
Films adapted into plays
Films adapted into television shows
Films directed by Emile Ardolino
Films scored by John Morris
Films set in the 1960s
Films set in 1963
Films set in New York (state)
Films shot in North Carolina
Films shot in Virginia
Films that won the Best Original Song Academy Award
Vestron Pictures films
1980s American films
Films set in resorts